Good Gracious, Annabelle is a lost 1919 American silent society comedy film starring Billie Burke. It is based on the 1916 Broadway play, Good Gracious, Annabelle by Clare Kummer. This film was produced by Famous Players-Lasky with distribution by Paramount Pictures.

Plot
As described in film magazines, Annabelle Leigh (Burke) lives extravagantly on a quarterly allowance that she spends monthly, until she is tricked out of two shares of a mining stock by crude, western miner John Rawson (Rawlinson), who compelled her to marry him after the death of her father in a squabble over the stock. The marriage is little more than form and rather than keeping her in a lonesome cabin where she cries perpetually, her magnanimous husband sets her free to go to New York City where she lives in an extravagant style. During a struggle for possession of her stock certificates with financier George Wimbledon (Kent), she takes a violent fancy towards a mysterious millionaire whom she meets during a party at Kent's Long Island estate. She tells him that she is resorting to all of the tricks she plays simply to save her husband, whose interests are threatened. The mysterious millionaire turns out to be that husband, who has shaved off his beard and wins her this time through love.

Cast
Billie Burke as Annabelle Leigh
Herbert Rawlinson as John Rawson
Gilbert Douglas as Harry Murchison
Crauford Kent as George Wimbledon
Frank Losee as William Gosling
Leslie Casey as Wilbur Jennings
Gordon Dana as Alfred Weatherby
Delle Duncan as Ethel Deane
Olga Downs as Gwendolyn Morley
Thomas Braidon as James Ludgate
Billie Wilson as Lottie

Later adaptation
The play was also the basis of the 1931 romantic comedy Annabelle's Affairs.

References

External links

American silent feature films
Films directed by George Melford
Paramount Pictures films
American films based on plays
1919 comedy films
Silent American comedy films
American black-and-white films
Lost American films
1919 lost films
Lost comedy films
1910s American films